Imamate and guardianship of Ali ibn Abi Talib or Imamate and Wilayah of Ali ibn Abi Talib refers to the spiritual position of Ali (1st Shia Imam and 4th Caliph of Islam) and his role in teaching the religion truth and establishing Islamic Sharia after Muhammad, the Prophet of Islam. The Caliphate of Ali ibn Abi Talib from 35 to 40 AH (656-661 AD) in the official history is not the subject of this article.

Regarding the succession of Ali, historians and scholars of Islamic history have generally either accepted the view of the Sunnis or rejected the truth of the matter as undiscoverable. One of the historians who has deviated from this common tradition is Wilferd Madelung. In the Encyclopaedia of Islam, Wilferd Madelung considers the main Shiite claims to be Ali 's own view because he believes that Ali considered himself the most worthy person for the caliphate compared to other companions, and blamed the entire Muslim community for turning away from him, but at the same time Ali praised Abu Bakr and Umar as caliphs and condemned the destruction of their character. Madelung believes that since in the Arab customs of the time, especially the Quraysh tribe, hereditary succession was common, and the Quran emphasized the importance of blood ties between the prophets, especially the Ahl al-Bayt, and that the Ansar supported Ali 's caliphate, Abu Bakr knew that a council would be formed and it leads to the election of Ali as the caliph, and for this reason he led the political currents in a calculated way to become the caliph himself. On the other hand, Laura Veccia Vaglieri in the Encyclopaedia of Islam doubt that Ali really hoped to succeed the Prophet, because the Arabs traditionally chose their leader from among the bearded ones, and Ali was only a little over thirty years old at that time and he did not have the necessary credentials to succeed Muhammad according to Arab tradition; Vaglieri believes that the Shiites, by narrating or interpreting the words attributed to Muhammad, insist that the Prophet intended to choose Ali as his successor, while there is no doubt that at the time of his last illness, Muhammad did not comment on his successor.

Wilferd Madelung writes that Ali could not have hoped to become caliph because of kinship with Muhammad; Because the Quraysh did not support the gathering of a prophet and a caliphate in one tribe. Madelung believes that this is not of the type of "coup d'etat carried out by Abu Bakr and Umar" in Saqifah incident, but stems from the deep jealousy of the Quraysh towards Ali; Therefore, Ali 's only chance to moderate the affairs of the Muslims could have been his full participation in the council, which was founded by Umar. Ibn Abbas narrates that somewhere Umar told him that Ali was in fact the most worthy person to succeed Muhammad, but we were afraid of him for two reasons. When Ibn Abbas eagerly asks Umar about these two reasons, Umar responds that the first is being young and the second is Ali 's great interest in the Banu Hashim family. According to this narration, all the aspirations of Ali and his supporters to establish the caliphate turned into despair. During this answer, Umar refers to the Saqifah incident. In this case, Umar refers to his belief in the formation of the council as the basis for appointing a caliph, and in practice, from now on, denounces any appointment of a caliph without consultation; Thus, the caliphate could not be monopolized by certain tribes and belonged to all the Quraysh branches.

Wilayah and Imamate of Ali in Quran and Hadith

Verse of Wilayah

Obedience Verse

Uli al-Amr Verse

Verse of Ikmal al-Din

Al-Tabligh Verse

Verse of Purification

Verse of Khayr ol-Bareyyah

Verse of Mawadda

Muhammadan guardianship
While Muhammad holds the position of prophethood and guardianship at the same time, Ali is the perfect guardian, hence he is called "the guardian of God". As Haydar Amuli says, guardianship is the Batin and inner aspect of prophecy. Henry Corbin says that just as the manifest of prophecy must come to an end in a person and that person is Muhammad, the interior aspect of that which is Wilayah must also come to an end in the manifestation of an earthly person. This person is Ali, who has the closest spiritual closeness to Muhammad. That is, the Muhammadan guardianship is the esoteric and hidden aspect of the prophethood of all the prophets that has emerged with Ali.

That is why most Sufi teachings bring their spiritual lineage to Ali and start from him. Henry Corbin says that even if there is controversy in the historical citation of these spiritual dynasties, it is more indicative of their intention to connect to the origin of the Wilayah.

Communication of Imamate and Wilayah

When Muhammad, Prophet of Islam, returned from the farewell pilgrimage in 632 AD, he delivered a sermon on Ali that was interpreted very differently by Shiites and Sunnis. According to the narration of these both groups, Muhammad said that Ali is his heir and brother, and that whoever accepts the Prophet as his Wali (leader or trusted friend) should also accept Ali as his Wali. Shiites consider this expression to mean appointing Ali as the successor of the Prophet and the first Imam. The Sunnis, on the other hand, consider this statement to be merely an expression of the Prophet's closeness to Ali and also an expression of his desire that Ali, as his cousin and adopted son, succeed him in his family responsibilities after his death.

Proportion of Caliphate and Wilayah and Imamate
Ali was the fourth caliph in the history of Islam. However, what has happened historically has no effect on the Imamate. Just as others who have held the position of caliphate do not benefit from the Imamate. Also, the lack of caliphate position does not diminish the rank of the Imam. Henry Corbin says that in Shi'ism the Imamate goes beyond the competition of families for power. Imamate does not depend on the confession and acceptance of the people. Rather, it is rooted in the divine splendour of the Imam, which people are unable to understand.

Historical differentiation of Ali Shiites
Wilferd Madelung says that after the Kharijites separated, Ali 's supporters pledged allegiance to him again based on Ali 's guardianship. This time, referring to the hadith of Ghadir narrated from Muhammad, they pledged to be the friend of the one with whom he is friends and the enemy of the one with whom he is the enemy (make friends with those who love him and oppose those who deny him). Ali stated that adherence to the traditions of Muhammad should be added to the condition of allegiance, but did not accept the traditions of Abu Bakr and Umar as the condition of allegiance. But the Kharijites said that allegiance should be based on the Quran and the traditions of Muhammad, Abu Bakr and Umar, not the guardianship of a particular person. Probably at this time, Ali publicly announced hadith of Ghadir and asked the people who had witnessed Ghadir Khumm to testify. Twelve or thirteen of the companions testified that they had heard the hadith from Muhammad that Ali was the "Wali" of whom Muhammad was the Wali (For whoever I am his leader, Ali is his leader). Thus, Ali explicitly established a religious authority beyond Abu Bakr and Umar.

In the following years, especially after the fall of Egypt and the killing of Shiites there, Ali more explicitly expressed his views, including about the previous caliphs and his right to the caliphate of Muhammad, in a letter to five of his Shiites, the text of which is in the book Al-Qaaraat by Ibrahim ibn Muhammad Saqafi Kufi.

See also
 Ali in Muslim culture
 Ali in the Quran
 Assassination of Ali
 Eid al-Ghadir
 Timeline of Ali's life

References

External links

 From Guardianship of Ali ibn Abi Talib (A.S) to return of Imam Mahdi (A.J)
 Studying Ali (AS)’s guardianship verses in Sunny resources
 Imam Ali’s Guardianship
 The Imamate of Ali in Traditions
 The Imamate must be from Allah

Ali
Shia Islam
Sufism
Mysticism
Imamate